The 1964 New Mexico Lobos football team was an American football team that represented the University of New Mexico in the Western Athletic Conference (WAC) during the 1964 NCAA University Division football season.  In their fifth season under head coach Bill Weeks, the Lobos compiled a 9–2 record (3–1 against WAC opponents), tied for the WAC championship, were ranked No. 16 in the final UPI Coaches poll, and outscored opponents, 185 to 190.

Fullback Chuck Kelly and defensive tackle Wayne Tvrdik were the team captains. The team's statistical leaders included quarterback Stan Quintana with 794 passing yards, Joe Harris with 582 rushing yards and 614 receiving yards, and Claude Ward with 42 points scored. 

Three New Mexico players were selected by the United Press International (UPI) as first-team players on the 1964 All-WAC football team: Quintana; Tvrdik; and guard Jack Abendschan. The UPI also selected Quintana as the 1964 WAC Player of the Year, citing his versatility and outstanding play on both offense and defense. Quintana ranked third in the WAC with 1,249 yards of total offense, fourth with 794 passing yards, and fifth with 455 rushing yards (including an 80-yard run against Colorado State). He also set a WAC record for interception return yards (including a 93-yard return against Wyoming), and his average of 7.3 yard of total offense per play in 1964 remains a New Mexico school record.   

Though New Mexico shared the WAC title with Arizona and Utah, neither of them made a bowl appearance due to fewer bowl games at the time. The Lobos defeated the Wildcats but lost to the Utes, which led to the three-way tie atop the WAC standings.

Schedule

References

New Mexico
New Mexico Lobos football seasons
Western Athletic Conference football champion seasons
New Mexico Lobos football